Triacanthagyna is a genus of dragonflies in the family Aeshnidae. The species have large eyes and broad wings. The females have three prominent spines under the last abdominal segment which gives the genus its name. They are commonly known as three-spined darners.

The genus contains the following species:
Triacanthagyna caribbea  - Caribbean Darner
Triacanthagyna dentata 
Triacanthagyna ditzleri 
Triacanthagyna nympha 
Triacanthagyna obscuripennis 
Triacanthagyna satyrus 
Triacanthagyna septima  - Pale-green Darner
Triacanthagyna trifida  - Phantom Darner
Triacanthagyna williamsoni

References

Aeshnidae
Anisoptera genera
Taxa named by Edmond de Sélys Longchamps